An arpent (sometimes called arpen) is a unit of length and a unit of area. It is a pre-metric French unit based on the Roman actus. It is used in Quebec, some areas of the United States that were part of French Louisiana, and in Mauritius and the Seychelles.

Etymology

The word arpent is believed to derive from the Late Latin arepennis (equal to half a jugerum), which in turn comes from the Gaulish *are-penno- ("end, extremity of a field").

Unit of length

There were various standard arpents. The most common were the arpent used in North America, which was defined as 180 French feet (of approximately ), and the arpent used in Paris, which was defined as 220 French feet.

 In North America, 1 arpent = 180 French feet = about 192 English feet = about 58.47 metres
 In Paris, 1 arpent = 220 French feet = about 234 English feet = about 71.46 metres

Unit of area

Historically, in North America, 1 (square) arpent, also known as a French acre, was 180 French feet × 180 French feet = 32,400 French square feet = about 3419 square metres = about 0.845 English acres.  Certain U.S. states have official definitions of the arpent which vary slightly:
 In Louisiana, Mississippi, Alabama, and Florida, the official conversion is 1 arpent = .
 In Arkansas and Missouri, the official conversion is 1 arpent = .

In Mauritius and Seychelles, an arpent is about 4220.87 square metres, 0.4221 hectares, 1.043 acres.

Louisiana
In Louisiana, parcels of land known as arpent sections or French arpent land grants also pre-date the Public Land Survey System (PLSS), but are treated as PLSS sections.

French arpent land divisions are long narrow parcels of land, also called ribbon farms, usually found along the navigable streams of southern Louisiana, and also found along major waterways in other areas. This system of land subdivision was begun by French settlers in the 18th century, according to typical French practice at the time and was continued by both the Spanish and by the American government after the acquisition of the Louisiana Purchase. A typical French arpent land division is 2 to 4 arpents wide along the river by 40 to 60 arpents deep, while the Spanish arpent land divisions tend to be 6 to 8 arpents wide by 40 arpents deep.

This method of land division provided each land-owner with river frontage as well as land suitable for cultivation and habitation. These areas are given numbers just like standard sections, although the section numbers frequently exceed the normal upper limit of 36.

See also

Acre
Morgen
 Units of measurement in France before the French Revolution
 Voltaire famously dismissed Canada as Quelques arpents de neige, "a few acres of snow".
 Weights and Measures Act (Canada)

References

Units of area
Units of length
Area
Surveying

hu:Hold (mértékegység)
ro:Iugăr